Fluorotabun is a highly toxic organophosphate nerve agent of the G-series. It's the fluorinated analog of tabun, i.e. the cyanide group is replaced by a fluorine atom.

GAF is considered an ineffective GA-like agent. It is less effective than GAA.

See also
Tabun (nerve agent)
GV (nerve agent)

References

G-series nerve agents
Acetylcholinesterase inhibitors
Organophosphates
Ethyl esters